Thelema.6 is the fifth studio album by Polish extreme metal band Behemoth. The album was recorded and mixed at the Hendrix Studios in Poland in July and August 2000 and was then mastered at the High-End Studio in Warsaw in 2000.

The album was re-released in 2000 as a limited  digipak edition that was limited to only 1,000 copies. An enhanced audio disc with a video for the song Christians to the Lions was included with the release.

Track listing 
Standard

Limited edition digipak
The limited edition was released which was limited to 1,000 copies and omits the track The End and replaces it with 11 blank tracks. Tracks 12–22 are silent tracks, lasting 4 seconds each.

Personnel 

 Behemoth
 Adam "Nergal" Darski – guitars, acoustic guitar, all vocals, lyrics, mixing
 Zbigniew Robert "Inferno" Promiński – drums and percussions, mixing
 Mateusz "Havoc" Śmierzchalski – guitars
 Additional musicians
 Marcin "Novy" Nowak – bass guitar
 Maciej Niedzielski (Artrosis) – synthesizers
 Łukasz "Mr. Jashackh" Jaszak – editing, samples

 Production
 Krzysztof Azarewicz – lyrics
 Sharon E. Wennekers – grammatical and poetical consultation
 Arkadiusz "Malta" Malczewski – sound engineering, mixing
 Grzegorz Piwkowski  – audio mastering
 Tomasz "Graal" Daniłowicz – cover design and artwork
 Dominik Kulaszewicz – photography
 Krzysztof Sadowski  – photography
 Note
 Recorded and mixed at Hendrix Studios, Poland, July–August 2000.
 Mastered at High-End Studio, Warsaw, 2000.

Release history

Charts

References 

2000 albums
Behemoth (band) albums
Avantgarde Music albums
Albums produced by Adam Darski